Horatio Boileau Goad (18 September 1839 – 12 February 1896) was a policeman who rose to be the secretary of the Municipal Corporation of Simla, British India. He had an extraordinary knowledge of local languages and customs and was a master of disguise. He was the eldest son of Major Samuel Boileau Goad who built and owned 33 homes in Simla.

Rudyard Kipling based the character Strickland in Plain Tales from the Hills on Goad.

Goad committed suicide in 1896.

References 

1839 births
1896 deaths
British police officers in India
Suicides in India
1890s suicides